IKAP (Iran Khodro Automobiles Peugeot) is a joint venture company between Iran Khodro and Stellantis, based in Tehran; it was established in 2016. It produces some Peugeot models and imports other models in CBU for Iran market.
The purposes of creating this company are manufacturing new Peugeot products in Iran and exports to Middle East and then the creation of Peugeot's production hub in West Asia. Products of this company in the first phase will be Peugeot 2008, Peugeot 208, Peugeot 301 and Peugeot 508. History of CEO : Morad Majlesi, Mohammadreza Motamed, Mohammad Haghpanahi(Who in his period, financial benefit was recognized for the first time)

References

Car manufacturers of Iran
Iran Khodro
Stellantis
Joint ventures